Pretty Hate Machine is the debut studio album by American industrial rock band Nine Inch Nails, released by TVT Records on October 20, 1989. Production of the record was handled by NIN frontman 
Trent Reznor and English producer Flood, among other contributors.

The album features a heavily synth-driven electronic sound blended with industrial and rock elements. Much like the band's later work, the album's lyrics contain themes of angst, betrayal, and lovesickness. The record was promoted with the singles "Down in It", "Head Like a Hole", and "Sin", as well as the accompanying tour. A remastered edition was released in 2010.

Although the record was successful, reaching No. 75 in the US and receiving highly favorable reviews from critics, Reznor (the band's only official member until 2016) feuded with TVT over promotion of the album, which led him to eventually sign with Interscope Records. Pretty Hate Machine was later certified triple-platinum by RIAA, becoming one of the first independently released albums to do so, and was included on several lists of the best releases of the 1980s. In 2020, Rolling Stone ranked Pretty Hate Machine at number 453 on its "500 Greatest Albums of All Time" list.

Background
While working nights as a handyman and engineer at the Right Track Studio in Cleveland, Ohio, Reznor used studio "down-time" to record and develop his own music. Playing most of the keyboards, drum machines, guitars, and samplers himself, he recorded a demo. The sequencing was done on a Macintosh Plus. Reznor mainly used an E-mu Emax, Prophet VS, Oberheim Xpander, and Minimoog as synthesizers.

With the help of manager John Malm Jr., he sent the demo to various record labels. Reznor received contract offers from many of the labels, but eventually signed with TVT Records, who were known mainly for releasing novelty and television jingle records. Pretty Hate Machine was recorded in various studios with Reznor collaborating with some of his most idolized producers: Flood, Keith LeBlanc, Adrian Sherwood, and John Fryer. Much like his recorded demo, Reznor refused to record the album with a conventional band, recording Pretty Hate Machine mostly by himself.

"A lot of it sounds immature to me now," he stated in 1991 of the recordings that were then two years old. "At first it totally sucked. I became completely withdrawn. I couldn't function in society very well. And the LP became a product of that. It's quite small scale, introverted, claustrophobic – that's the feel I went for."

Reznor discussed the recording and touring of Pretty Hate Machine in the April 1990 issue of Keyboard. He used an E-mu Emax because it produced a high-end buzzing noise when transposing down sounds. Rough and first takes of vocals and guitar were used to contrast the quantized drums and bass. Reznor hated the factory sounds of the Emax but had not transferred anything from his old Emulator, and used samples from his record collection for all the drum sounds. He initially expected to use real drum sounds when recording the album, but in the end he and the producers merely equalized his drum samples.

After the album was released, a recording known as Purest Feeling surfaced. The bootleg album contains early demo recordings of many of the tracks featured on Pretty Hate Machine, as well as a couple that were not used ("Purest Feeling", "Maybe Just Once", and an instrumental introduction to "Sanctified" called "Slate").

Music and lyrics
"I wasn't proud of a lot of the things I was saying," Reznor recalled, "but I said to myself, 'Well, no one's going to hear this stuff anyway.' ... The record is honest and that's where its power came from."

Unlike the industrial music of Nine Inch Nails' contemporaries, Pretty Hate Machine displays catchy riffs and verse-chorus song structures rather than repetitive electronic beats. Reznor's lyrics express adolescent angst and feelings of betrayal by lovers, society, or God. Themes of despair are collocated with lovesick sentiments. Pitchforks Tom Breihan categorized it as a synth-pop album that was shaped by industrial music's "nascent new-wave period rather than its subsequent styles." According to Breihan, the beats were muscular, but not in the vein of metal or post-punk, and that the most rock-inspired song on the album was "Head Like a Hole".

Journalist Jon Pareles described the album as "electro-rock or industrial rock, using drum machines, computerized synthesizer riffs and obviously processed sounds to detail, and usually denounce, an artificial world." Tom Popson of the Chicago Tribune called it a dance album partly characterized by industrial dance's aggressive sound: "Reznor's electronics-plus-guitar LP also carries a brighter techno-pop element that might remind some of Depeche Mode. Things occasionally mellow out to moody atmospherics, while Reznor's vocals range from whispers to screams." PopMatters AJ Ramirez regarded the album as "a synthesizer-dominated industrial dance record that on occasion slipped under the alternative rock banner."

Reznor has humorously described Pretty Hate Machine as "the all-purpose alternative album," remarking that "if you want to stage dive to it, you can, but if you're a big Depeche Mode fan, you can get what you need out of it as well." Reznor further stated: "I like electronic music, but I like it to have some aggression. That 'first wave' of electro music – Human League and Devo – that's the easiest way to use it. To be able to get some humanity and aggression into it in a cool way, that's the thing ... Pretty Hate Machine is a record you can listen to and get more out of each time. To me, something like Front 242 is the opposite: great at first but, after 10 listens, that's it."

In a commentary on the album, Tom Hull said that Reznor's "notion of industrial is closer to New Order new wave, but with a harder metallic gleam and more dystopian attitude."

Samples
Prince, Jane's Addiction, and Public Enemy are listed in the liner notes as artists whose music was sampled on the album. Segments of Prince's "Alphabet St." and Jane's Addiction's "Had a Dad" can be heard in "Ringfinger". Other samples were edited or distorted so as to be unrecognizable, such as the introduction to "Kinda I Want To". "Something I Can Never Have" features unused backing tracks created by John Fryer for This Mortal Coil. A speech from Midnight Express was sampled at low volume during the pause in "Sanctified". On the album's 2010 reissue, this sample is not present, most likely due to clearance issues.

Reznor stated, "I was tempted to lay in more of other people‘s stuff, but I thought that would lend a real dated quality to the record, seeing where that has gone the way it has in hip-hop." Time constraints similarly prevented him from accumulating "good sounds" as he wanted. He obtained "weird percussion tracks" by sampling loops from artists like Public Enemy, playing them backwards and modulating them in Macintosh Turbosynth with an oscillator tuned to the pitch of the song, obtaining "this weird flanging-type thing that‘s in key". He said that "every drum fill on 'Terrible Lie' is lifted intact from somewhere. There are six other songs playing through that cut, recorded on tape, in and out, depending on where they worked."

Cover art
The cover art was designed by Gary Talpas, which is a photo of the blades of a turbine stretched vertically to create the illusion of a rib cage. For the 2010 reissue, visual artist Rob Sheridan was assigned to update the cover art by Reznor to tone down the heavy late-Eighties neon aesthetic. Unfortunately, Sheridan was unable to locate the original artwork as it was deemed lost forever. To remedy this, he had to reverse engineer the cover art by scanning the existing cover art and digitally painted the image in very high resolution.

Touring

In 1990, Reznor quickly formed a band, hiring guitarist and future Filter frontman Richard Patrick, and began the Pretty Hate Machine Tour Series, in which they toured North America as an opening act for alternative rock artists such as Peter Murphy and The Jesus and Mary Chain. Nine Inch Nails' live set at the time was known for louder, more aggressive versions of the studio songs. At some point, Reznor began smashing his equipment onstage (Reznor preferred using the heel of his boots to strip the keys from expensive keyboards, most notably the Yamaha DX7); Nine Inch Nails then embarked on a world tour that continued through the first Lollapalooza festival in 1991 and culminated in an opening slot to support Guns N' Roses on their European tour.

Critical reception

Pretty Hate Machine received widespread acclaim from music critics, who praised the production and Reznor's vocals. In a contemporary review for Rolling Stone, Michael Azerrad called Pretty Hate Machine "industrial-strength noise over a pop framework" and "harrowing but catchy music"; Reznor proclaimed this combination "a sincere statement" of "what was in [his] head at the time". Robert Hilburn found Reznor's "dark obsession" compelling in the Los Angeles Times, while Q said Reznor "scans the spectrum of modern dance" with a "panoramic vision" that is "both admirably adventurous and yet accessible." Select critic Neil Perry said that record was "a flawed but listenable labour of loathing". Ralph Traitor of Sounds said that "Reznor has guts, and they make his Machine one to be treated with respect", finding that the album was comparable to releases by Ministry and Foetus.

Jon Pareles was less impressed in his review for The New York Times, writing that Pretty Hate Machine "stays so close to the conventions established by Depeche Mode, Soft Cell and New Order that it could be a parody album". Mark Jenkins of The Washington Post found the music "competent but undistinctive stuff" and believed the "angry denunciations" of songs such as "Terrible Lie" are overshadowed by the "nursery-rhyme" chants of "Down in It". Tom Popson wrote in the Chicago Tribune that "the playing and production get points for introducing some variety to the industrial style, but the moments of soap-on-a-rope singing tend to cancel them out."

In a retrospective review, AllMusic editor Steve Huey commended Reznor for giving "industrial music a human voice, a point of connection" with his "tortured confusion and self-obsession", and felt that "the greatest achievement of Pretty Hate Machine was that it brought emotional extravagance to a genre whose main theme had nearly always been dehumanization." Upon its 2010 reissue, Will Hermes of Rolling Stone called it "the first industrial singer-songwriter album" and commended the sound produced by Flood and Keith LeBlanc, who he said "taught Reznor a lot." Kyle Ryan of The A.V. Club felt that the album "remains the work of an artist just discovering his voice" and said that "20 years later, it doesn't warrant repeat listens like its successors." He found some of its synth and sampled sounds to still be dated after the album's remastering and Reznor's lyrics "mopey" and "silly". In an interview with Blender, journalist and novelist Chuck Palahniuk said that the album "seemed like the first honest piece of music I ever heard." In 2020, Pretty Hate Machine was included at number 453 on Rolling Stones "500 Greatest Albums of All Time" list.

Commercial performance
Released on October 20, 1989, Pretty Hate Machine was a commercial success and entered the Billboard 200 in February 1990. Although it peaked at number 75 on the Billboard 200, the album gained popularity through word of mouth and developed an underground following. Pretty Hate Machine was certified Gold by the Recording Industry Association of America (RIAA) on March 3, 1992, two years after the album's initial release, for shipping 500,000 units in the USA. Three years later in 1995, it became one of the first independently released records to attain a Platinum certification. It eventually garnered a triple Platinum certification on May 12, 2003, with three million copies sold in the United States.  Pretty Hate Machine spent a total of 115 weeks on the Billboard 200 chart, tying their sophomore album, The Downward Spiral as their longest charting effort.

The album was also certified Silver by the British Phonographic Industry (BPI) on November 1, 1995, following its number 67 peak on the UK Albums Chart.

Reissue
Pretty Hate Machine went out of print through TVT, but was reissued by Rykodisc on November 22, 2005, with slightly modified packaging. Reznor had expressed interest in making a deluxe edition with surround sound remastering and new remixes, similar to the rerelease of The Downward Spiral. Rykodisc initially accepted the idea, but wanted Reznor to pay the production costs.

On March 29, 2010, the recording rights to Pretty Hate Machine were acquired by the Bicycle Music Company and on October 22, 2010, Reznor announced that a remastered edition would be released the following month. The remaster included new cover art by Rob Sheridan and the bonus track "Get Down, Make Love", a Queen cover originally from the "Sin" single. The 2010 reissue was mastered by Tom Baker at the Precision Mastering in Hollywood, California.

"PHM 2.0 is far brighter and clearer than its original incarnation," observed Classic Rock, "but ultimately it's the strength of the songwriting… that shines through. Although that said, a super bass beef-up job on an already infamous cover of Queen's 'Get Down, Make Love' ups the sleaze 'n' grind quotient no end."

Before the album's rerelease, a fan website was launched featuring touring information for Pretty Hate Machine, the videos for "Head Like a Hole" and "Down in It" (with remastered sound), the uncut video for "Sin" (a remix for the video was used) and two early live segments, one with interviews.

The album and its respective singles were included in a Record Store Day Black Friday exclusive box set, Halo I–IV in 2015.

Track listing

Notes
  signifies an additional remix producer.
  signifies a remixer.

Personnel
Credits adapted from the liner notes of Pretty Hate Machine.

 Trent Reznor – vocals, arrangement, continuity, digital editing, programming ; production ; mixing ; engineering 
 Tom Baker – mastering 
 Sean Beavan – engineering 
 Blumpy – remastering preparation
 Tony Dawsey – mastering
 Doug DeAngelis – engineering 
 Flood – engineering, production ; additional synth programming 
 John Fryer – engineering ; mixing ; production 
 Hypo Luxa – engineering, production 
 Kennan Keating – engineering 

 Keith LeBlanc – additional remix production ; engineering ; mixing ; production ; remix 
 Jeff "Critter" Newell 
 Tim Niemi – additional synth programming 
 Richard Patrick – drone guitar at end 
 Ken Quartarone – engineering 
 Rob Sheridan – art direction 
 Adrian Sherwood – engineering, mixing, production 
 Jeffrey Silverthorne – portrait photography
 Gary Talpas – original sleeve
 Chris Vrenna – continuity, digital editing

Charts

Certifications

References

Bibliography

External links
 Pretty Hate Machine at Discogs

1989 debut albums
Albums produced by Adrian Sherwood
Albums produced by Al Jourgensen
Albums produced by Flood (producer)
Albums produced by John Fryer (producer)
Albums produced by Keith LeBlanc
Albums produced by Trent Reznor
Nine Inch Nails albums
TVT Records albums